Born to Be (also known as Transformation) is a 2019 American documentary film directed by Tania Cypriano. The film follows a doctor who strives to give transgender people full access to health and surgical care.

It premiered at the New York Film Festival on September 28, 2019, and is scheduled to be released online on November 18, 2020.

Premise 
Born to Be follows the work of Dr. Jess Ting at the groundbreaking Mount Sinai Center for Transgender Medicine and Surgery in New York City-where, for the first time ever, all transgender and gender non-conforming people have access to quality transition-related health and surgical care. With extraordinary access, this feature-length documentary takes an intimate look at how one doctor's work impacts the lives of his patients as well as how his journey from renowned plastic surgeon to pioneering gender-affirming surgeon has led to his own transformation.

Production 
The film was shot in New York City, New York, United States.

Release 
The film is scheduled to be released online by Kino Lorber on November 18, 2020.

Reception

Critical response 
Norman Gidney of Film Threat scored the film 7/10 and said "Born To Be humanizes what it is to be trans and makes the struggle something you can feel." Variety's Owen Gleiberman reviewed the film positively, saying that it is "A moving and fascinatingly forward-looking documentary."

Accolades

References

External links 

 

2019 films
2019 documentary films
American documentary films
Transgender-related documentary films
2019 LGBT-related films
Transgender and medicine
2010s English-language films
2010s American films